WOBX-FM (98.1 MHz) is a radio station broadcasting a sports format. Licensed to Manteo, North Carolina, United States, it serves the Elizabeth City-Nags Head area.  The station is currently owned by East Carolina Radio.

Name Change
On June 21, 2009. WOBX-FM Dropped The 98X Name and became 98 OBX. but kept the Active Rock format.

Nick Radio
On August 30, 2010 WOBX-FM changed their format to classic hits, branded as "Nick Radio".

Newstalk 98.1
On September 13, 2010 WOBX-FM changed their format to news/talk, branded as "Newstalk 98.1".

98.1 The Score
On March 27, 2015, WOBX flipped to sports talk as "98.1 The Score", adding Washington Nationals baseball and the Westwood One radio networks' sporting event broadcasts. WOBX-FM also airs sports talk shows from the Fox Sports Radio and CBS Sports Radio networks.

Previous logo
 (WOBX-FM's previous logo under its previous active rock format)

References

External links
98.1 The SCORE

OBX